Desboro is a community in Chatsworth Township, Grey County in southwestern Ontario, Canada, located south of Owen Sound and near the community of Chatsworth. The community was named for Desborough in Northamptonshire, England.

References

Communities in Grey County